Adriano Faria Pimenta (born 14 November 1982 in Goiânia) is a Brazilian footballer who currently plays for Rio Branco.

Club career

The offensively-minded midfielder started his career in the youth squad of Guarani FC. Before the 2000/01 season Adriano transferred to the Japanese club Nagoya Grampus Eight. After one season in Japan he returned to Guarani FC, but continued to play only a substitute role. He therefore transferred before the 2005/06 season to the Swiss Super League club FC Thun and signed a contract through June 2008. In Thun he immediately established himself in the starting squad and became a regular for the club. He plays in the role of midfield play maker.

During the away leg of the qualifying match for the 2005/06 Champions League group stage against Malmö FF Adriano scored the deciding goal in Thun's 1:0 win. He played in all 6 group stage matches for Thun and scored in the home match against Ajax Amsterdam to make the score 2:2 at the time. After the conclusion of the group stage FC Thun was in 3rd place and qualified to play in the UEFA Cup first knock-out stage. Adriano played in both matches against German club Hamburger SV and scored the winning goal in the 1:0 home win for Thun. Due to the 0:2 loss in the away leg FC Thun was knocked out of the competition at this stage. On 15 January 2007, he moved to Japan again to play for J1 League division 1 side Yokohama FC.

In January 2008, he returned to Swiss side Thun, but in February 2008, he left for Bragantino.

In October 2008, Adriano signed with 2007–08 New Zealand football champions Waitakere United.

In January 2009, he arrived in Bolivia and signed a one-year contract with club Blooming. On August 2009 Pimenta reached a mutual agreement with Blooming and the contract was terminated, then he returned to Brazil and joined first division club Sport Recife at the time. The following year Pimenta was loaned to Grêmio Prudente, and not long after he moved to Fortaleza.

Club statistics

Honours
 Campeonato Pernambucano in 2010 with Sport Recife

References

External links 
 
 
 Adriano Pimenta at playmakerstats.com (English version of ogol.com.br)

1982 births
Living people
Sportspeople from Goiânia
Brazilian footballers
Brazilian expatriate footballers
Guarani FC players
Expatriate footballers in Japan
J1 League players
Nagoya Grampus players
Expatriate footballers in Switzerland
Swiss Super League players
FC Thun players
Yokohama FC players
Clube Atlético Bragantino players
Expatriate association footballers in New Zealand
Expatriate footballers in Bolivia
Club Blooming players
Sport Club do Recife players
Fortaleza Esporte Clube players
Atlético Clube Goianiense players
Brazilian expatriate sportspeople in Bolivia
Association football midfielders
Brazilian expatriate sportspeople in New Zealand